This is a list of crossings of Fishkill Creek, a tributary of the Hudson River in Dutchess County, New York, USA.

Crossings

Transportation in Dutchess County, New York
Lists of river crossings in New York